The Food and Drugs Authority (or FDA, formerly known as the Food and Drugs Board) is a Ghanaian government agency responsible for the inspection, certification and proper distribution of foods and food products as well as drugs in Ghana. The board was established by the Food and Drugs Law 1992, PNDC Law 305B. 

Delese A. A. Darko is currently the CEO of FDA.

In May 2020, the FDA was recognised by the World Health Organization as a Level Three listed institution.

References

 

Ministries and Agencies of State of Ghana